Fatima-Ezzahra Aboufaras (born 28 February 2002) is a Moroccan taekwondo practitioner. She represented Morocco at the 2019 African Games held in Rabat, Morocco and she won the gold medal in the women's +73 kg event.

At the 2018 Summer Youth Olympics held in Buenos Aires, Argentina, she won the gold medal in the +63 kg event. In the final, she defeated Kimia Hemati of Iran.

She won the silver medal in the women's +67 kg event at the 2022 Mediterranean Games held in Oran, Algeria.

References

External links 

 

Living people
2002 births
Place of birth missing (living people)
Moroccan female taekwondo practitioners
Taekwondo practitioners at the 2018 Summer Youth Olympics
Youth Olympic gold medalists for Morocco
African Games medalists in taekwondo
African Games gold medalists for Morocco
Competitors at the 2019 African Games
Competitors at the 2022 Mediterranean Games
Mediterranean Games silver medalists for Morocco
Mediterranean Games medalists in taekwondo
Islamic Solidarity Games medalists in taekwondo
Islamic Solidarity Games competitors for Morocco
21st-century Moroccan women